Dibak (also Romanized as Dībak) is a village in Sokmanabad Rural District, Safayyeh District, Khoy County, West Azerbaijan Province, Iran. At the 2006 census, its population was 124, in 24 families.

References 

Populated places in Khoy County